Martha Lorraine MacDonald is the professor of economics in the department of economics, St Mary's University, Halifax, Nova Scotia, Canada, and was the president of the International Association for Feminist Economics (IAFFE) from 2007 to 2008.

Her main areas of research are: economic restructuring, social security policy, gender and economy. She has spoken on numerous occasions in Canada's Standing Committee on the Status of Women, and in 2009 she co-edited Gender and the contours of precarious employment with Iain Campbell and Leah Vosko.

Education 
MacDonald gained her degree from Dalhousie University, Nova Scotia in 1971, she then went to the US to study for her masters (1975) and her doctorate (1983), both in economics, at Boston College, Chestnut Hill, Massachusetts.

Selected bibliography

Books 
  In French as Les femmes et la population active published by Statistique Canada.

Chapters in books

Journal articles

Papers

See also 
 Feminist economics
 List of feminist economists

References

External links 
 Profile page: Martha MacDonald St Mary's University
 Profile page: Martha MacDonald On the move partnership

Morrissey College of Arts & Sciences alumni
Canadian economists
Dalhousie University alumni
Feminist economists
Living people
Saint Mary's University (Halifax) alumni
Canadian women economists
Year of birth missing (living people)
Place of birth missing (living people)
Presidents of the International Association for Feminist Economics